Samu Wara (born 24 January 1986) is an Australian professional rugby union footballer. His regular playing position is on the wing.

Background
Samu Wara was born in Sydney, New South Wales, Australia.

Career
Wara was born and raised in Leichhardt, New South Wales, where he played junior rugby league. He went on to play NSWRL Premier League with Balmain Ryde Eastwood Tigers in 2007. He joined South Sydney's feeder club North Sydney Bears in 2008, where he played in the NSW Cup in 2008 and 2009. Wara made the NSW Cup Team of the Year in 2008.  Wara made a total of 45 appearances for Norths and scored 18 tries.

He switched codes in 2010 to play rugby union with Northern Suburbs, and was selected to join the Brumbies academy by then coach Andy Friend. Wara was included in the Brumbies squad for 2011, but Friend was sacked at the start of the season and Wara did not get to play in the senior team.
Wara joined the Western Force and made his franchise debut in Week 1 of the 2012 Super Rugby season against the Brumbies in Canberra. He went on to earn 9 caps over the season for the Force.

After a brief stint playing in Port Macquarie in 2013, Wara joined French Top 14 club Oyannax for the 2013–14 season.

Reference list

External links
 It's Rugby stats
 

1986 births
Australian expatriate rugby union players
Australian expatriate sportspeople in France
Australian people of I-Taukei Fijian descent
Australian rugby league players
Australian rugby union players
Balmain Ryde-Eastwood Tigers players
ACT Brumbies players
Expatriate rugby union players in France
Living people
New South Wales Country Eagles players
North Sydney Bears NSW Cup players
Oyonnax Rugby players
Rugby league fullbacks
Rugby league wingers
Rugby union players from Sydney
Rugby union wings
Western Force players
Fiji international rugby union players